Balatoncsicsó is a village in Veszprém county, Hungary. Situated in the hills on the North Shore of Lake Balaton, it is reasonably unspoiled by tourism and maintains a sense of community.

External links 
 Street map (Hungarian)
 Village Home Page (Hungarian)

Populated places in Veszprém County